Beatin Hearts was the first 33.3 rpm studio album by the New Zealand music label Flying Nun, and the first album by rock band Builders. It was recorded in August 1982 and released in 1983. It contains seventeen songs and lasts for 57 minutes. Characteristically for the band, the album caused typographical difficulties for critics writing about the album, as its title contains an ambiguous character. The capital "I" of the word "Beatin" contains a cross bar in the centre, so that it doubles as an "E". The title may therefore be read (but not spoken) as both "Beatin' Hearts" and "Beaten Hearts".

The album has been praised by rock critics (see below), and described by non-professional writers as everything from "basic stupid rock and roll waste of time" to "a unique brand of psychedelic rock – post-punk, often minimalistic garage rock psychedelia born on the art side of tracks. The album seemed to me no less than a work of a genius – it is so sophisticated, unpretentious, utterly individual and it belongs in the higher spheres than [sic] any pop music."   http://rateyourmusic.com/release/album/the_builders/beatin_hearts/.

Sessions for the album were held in three days at Progressive Studios in Anzac Ave, Auckland, with Terry King engineering. The album was mixed at Progressive. The entire project was financed by Flying Nun and steered by Chris Knox and promoter Doug Hood. Two years after its initial release the album was purchased by South Indies, who licensed the album to Grapefruit in the USA for 2016 vinyl re-release. Flying Nun re-released the album as a CD, in 1994.

Critical reception
"Direen's masterpiece, Beatin Hearts (1983), was recorded in Auckland's Progressive studios with prize money from the 1982 Battle of the Bands in Christchurch. The album is chock-full of smoky beat musings."

« Beaten Hearts » reste sans doute la meilleure entrée en matière pour tous ceux qui s'intéressent au parcours mythique de Direen. Tantôt aurore glacée, tantôt crépuscule grisâtre, ce disque monochrome, à la production forcément lacunaire, comporte de véritables joyaux tels « Dirty & Disgusting », « Alien » (avec Chris Knox) ou encore « Inquest ». L’album, un des premiers sortis par Flving Nun, est fondateur pour toute une scène en cours d’éclosion. Beau voyage. (Morvan Boury) 

""The early Builders ... played gritty garage punk that owed a heavy musical debt to the Velvet Underground while addressing more indigenous lyrical concerns." Bill Meyer.

"He [Direen] plays fucking brilliantly, throws all his gut feelings, hard-won insights and barbed intellect into these unique songs while the pinball machines and drunken flirtations drown him out" Chris Knox, quoted in 1994.

Personnel
Builders (1982)
Bill Direen – lead, harmony and backing vocals; rhythm and lead guitars; Jansen organ; violin, bass, maracas.
Campbell McLay –  bass, lead and rhythm guitars.
Malcolm Grant – drums.
Chris Knox – Organ, harmonising vocals
Mike Dooley – Drums.

References

1982 albums
Garage rock revival albums
Flying Nun Records albums